The  is a river located in Takamatsu, Kagawa, Japan.

Name
The river is named "Aibiki" (roughly translating as "mutual pulling") because both its source and its mouth are in the Seto Inland Sea. During low tide, the river flows towards both the mouth and the origin, making it seem like it is being pulled both ways.

It is also said that the name came about during the Battle of Yashima, which was fought between the Minamoto and Taira clans.

References

Rivers of Kagawa Prefecture
Rivers of Japan